The 1927 Ladies Open Championships was held at the Queen's Club, West Kensington in London from 28 November - 4 December 1926. Cecily Fenwick won her second successive title defeating Nancy Cave in a repeat of the 1926 final. This championship was held during 1926 but in the 1926/27 season so is attributed as being the 1927 event. Joyce Cave was still unable to compete due to a wrist injury.

Draw and results

Section A (round robin)

Section B (round robin)

Section C (round robin)

Section D (round robin)

Second round

Semi finals

Final

References

Women's British Open Squash Championships
British Open Squash Championships
Women's British Open Squash Championships
Squash competitions in London
British Open Championships
Women's British Open Squash Championships
Women's British Open Squash Championships